Sally El-Hosaini is a Welsh-Egyptian film director and screenwriter.

Her debut feature film My Brother the Devil won awards internationally, including at the 2013 Evening Standard Film Awards, 2012 Sundance Film Festival, 2012 Berlin International Film Festival and 2012 BFI London Film Festival Awards, amongst others. It stars Fady Elsayed, BIFA Award-winning James Krishna Floyd and César Award nominated actor Saïd Taghmaoui.

Background

El-Hosaini was born in Swansea, Wales, of Egyptian Welsh parentage, and raised in Cairo, Egypt. She had her first story published when she was seven years old.

El-Hosaini completed her high school education at Atlantic College, one of the United World Colleges, in Wales. She went on to read Arabic with Middle Eastern Studies at Durham University. Before making films she taught English literature at a girls' school in Sana'a, Yemen and worked for Amnesty International. She is a long-time resident of Hackney, London.

Career

El Hosaini was a trainee to the late renegade theatre director, John Sichel. She began her career working on Middle East documentaries and then moved to independent feature films, where she was a production coordinator for many years. She has stated that her work in British television documentaries felt "formulaic", and that she found she could be more truthful in fiction.

She was the script editor/specialist researcher of the BAFTA and Emmy Award winning HBO Films/BBC Drama mini-series House of Saddam. She spent 2 years in research for the series, which won a Grierson Award for best factual drama.

She received a regional (Welsh) BAFTA for her 2008 short film, The Fifth Bowl.

In 2009, her short film Henna Night was officially selected for the London Lesbian and Gay Film Festival. It was in competition at the International Film Festival Rotterdam and the Raindance Film Festival.

El-Hosaini participated in the 2009 Sundance Directors and Screenwriters Labs, developing My Brother the Devil.

She was named one of Screen International's UK Stars of Tomorrow for 2009.

My Brother the Devil was released theatrically in 12 US cities, May 2013 and had a wide release in UK cinemas, November 2012. Further releases in Canada, Australia, New Zealand & Germany. The film screened at over 40 International Film Festivals, where it received 12 awards, 17 nominations & an Honourable Mention.

As Writer/Director of the film, El-Hosaini won the Most Promising Newcomer Award at 2013 Evening Standard Film Awards, Best Screenplay at the 2013 Writer's Guild of Great Britain Awards, the Best Newcomer Award at the 2012 BFI London Film Festival and the UK New Talent Award at the British Women in Film and Television Awards in 2012. She was also nominated for the BIFA Douglas Hickox award for Best Debut Film at the British Independent Film Awards and the Sutherland Trophy (Best First Film) at BFI London Film Festival.

In 2014 she was one of two directors chosen by Danny Boyle to direct Babylon, the television series he co-created and produced for Channel 4 and SundanceTV.

She has been profiled by The Guardian, BBC America, IndieWire, and Variety who named her a 2014 "Brit to Watch".

Filmography

Awards

 Won Best European Film (Europa Cinemas Label Award) – 2012 Berlinale for My Brother the Devil
 Won Best Newcomer – 2012 BFI London Film Festival for My Brother the Devil
 Won Most Promising Newcomer – 2013 Evening Standard Film Awards for My Brother the Devil
 Won Best Screenplay – 2013 Writer's Guild of Great Britain Awards for My Brother the Devil
 Won UK New Talent Award – 2012 British Women in Film and Television Awards 
 Won Grand Jury Award – 2012 LA Outfest for My Brother the Devil
 Won Regional BAFTA – 2008 Short Film, "The Fifth Bowl"
 Honourable Mention 'Outstanding First Feature Award' – 2012 Frameline Film Festival, San Francisco for My Brother the Devil
 Nominated Grand Jury Prize – 2012 Sundance Film Festival for My Brother the Devil
 Nominated BIFA Douglas Hickox award for Best Debut Film – 2012 British Independent Film Awards for My Brother the Devil
 Nominated Sutherland Trophy (Best First Film) – 2012 BFI London Film Festival for My Brother the Devil

References

External links

Official Facebook Page
Official Twitter

Year of birth missing (living people)
21st-century British screenwriters
21st-century Egyptian writers
21st-century Egyptian women writers
21st-century Welsh writers
21st-century Welsh women writers
People from Swansea
Writers from Cairo
Female writers from Cairo
Living people
Egyptian women film directors
Welsh women film directors
Welsh people of Egyptian descent
Alumni of Durham University
People educated at Atlantic College
People educated at a United World College
WFTV Award winners
Welsh screenwriters
Egyptian screenwriters
British women screenwriters